Guangdong University Of Finances and Economics (Simplified Chinese: 广东财经大学), established in 1983, is a public university in the capital of Guangdong province.

History
Guangdong University of Finances and Economics was established in 1983. As one of the key institutions of higher learning in Guangdong Province, GUFE offers undergraduate and graduate programs in economics, management, law, English and Chinese literature, science, and engineering which confer bachelor's degrees or master's degrees, in addition to a second bachelor's degree for law students.

GUFE has over 17,228 full-time students (including postgraduates and overseas Chinese students and those from Hong Kong, Macao, and Taiwan).

Campuses
GUFE comprises two campuses. The Guangzhou Campus of the university is at No. 21, Luntou Road or Chisha Road, Haizhu District, Guangzhou. The Sanshui Campus is in the Yundonghai Tourist Economic Zone in Sanshui, Foshan. The university and Zengcheng Sun City Ltd. in Guangzhou run an undergraduate independent college, Huashang College.

GUFE covers an area of over 2383 mu (1,590,675 square meters). The total value of all equipments for teaching and scientific research amounts to 91.4 million yuan, including multimedia teaching equipment, language labs, simulated law courts, a judiciary technical experimental center, and commercial science labs. Intranet has been built in classrooms of all teaching buildings.

Administration
The university has a number of faculties:
Management, Law, Accounting, Economics and Statistics, Taxation and Public Finance Administration, Finance, Foreign Languages, Information, Humanities and Communication, and Tourism and Environment.

Faculty structure
GUFE has established 14 schools and departments offering 16 master-degree programs and 36 undergraduate specialties, among which constitution and administration law and enterprise management are of provincial priority specialties, and marketing, law, accounting, information management & information systems, Finance, International Economics & Trade, and Public Finance are classified as provincial brand specialties.

GUFE owns several laboratories, including the Guangdong Laboratory of E-commerce Marketing Applied Technology, the Economy & Management Laboratory, and the Experimental Center of Enterprise Resource Planning. It also owns the Research Center of Law Build-up & Economic Development and the Journal of Guangdong University of Business Studies.

GUFE has more than 894 professional teachers, among whom are 135 professors and 228 associate professors, 180 teachers who are doctoral degree holders or are studying for doctor's degrees, and 480 teachers who hold master's degrees. The university has also engaged over 100 Chinese and foreign experts on economics, management, and law as part-time or guest professors.

GUFE practices the systems of credits for the degrees offered.

Library

GUFE's library has a collection of 2.45 million items. Its digital library has a collection of 300,000 books. An NIC is provided for every student in the dormitory on all the campuses.

References

External links
Official University Website

Universities and colleges in Guangzhou
Educational institutions established in 1983
1983 establishments in China